Stéphane Garcia (born 4 April 1991) is a Swiss football midfielder.

Career 
Garcia began his career with Etoile-Carouge FC, who was promoted to the Swiss Challenge League in summer 2006, after two years joined in July 2008 to Neuchâtel Xamax. He played only one game for Neuchâtel Xamax and joined on 29 June 2009 on loan to FC Le Mont before transferring back to Etoile-Carouge FC. He moved on to FC Lugano in July 2012.

References

External links
 

1991 births
Living people
Swiss men's footballers
Neuchâtel Xamax FCS players
Étoile Carouge FC players
FC Lugano players
Association football midfielders
Footballers from Geneva